U80 may refer to:
 Small nucleolar RNA SNORD80, a small nucleolar RNA
 German submarine U-80, several boats